Now You Know may refer to:
"Now You Know" (Desperate Housewives), the premiere episode of Desperate Housewives season four
Now You Know (novel), a 1993 novel by British author Michael Frayn
Now You Know (album), a 2002 album released by Doug Martsch of Built to Spill
Now You Know (film) a 2002 film directed by Jeff Anderson
"Now You Know", a song by The Afghan Whigs from their 1993 album Gentlemen
"Now You Know", a song by Bobby Troup and recorded by The Four Freshmen
"Now You Know", a song from Stephen Sondheim's musical Merrily We Roll Along
"Now You Know", a song by American punk band 2Cents, off their album Dress To Kill
"Now You Know", a song by "Weird Al" Yankovic from the 2022 film Weird: The Al Yankovic Story: See Weird: The Al Yankovic Story (soundtrack)
Now You Know, the longest-running TV show on UGBC-TV at Boston College